Pakistan Tennis Federation (PTF) is the governing body of tennis in Pakistan. It has played a vital role in the development of domestic, national and international tennis in Pakistan, producing a number of young talented players. It also governs teams such as the Pakistan Fed Cup team and the Pakistan Davis Cup team.

Salim Saifullah Khan is the current president of the Federation, while Gul Rehman is the secretary general.

History

In 1947, the All Pakistan Lawn Tennis Association was formed after Pakistan gained independence from the United Kingdom. The Association later changed its name to the Pakistan Tennis Federation.

International and national affiliations
 International Tennis Federation (ITF)
 Asian Tennis Federation
 Pakistan Sports Board
 Pakistan Olympic Association

Affiliated bodies
The following bodies are affiliated with the Federation:
 Sindh Tennis Association 
 Punjab Lawn Tennis Association 
 Islamabad Tennis Association 
 Balochistan Tennis Association 
 Khyber Pakhtunkhwa Tennis Association 
 Pakistan Senior Tennis Association 
 Higher Education Commission
 Pakistan Air Force
 Pakistan Navy
 Pakistan Army
 WAPDA
 Pakistan International Airlines
 Pakistan Ordnance Factory
 International Club of Pakistan 
 Pakistan Railways

Headquarters
The head office is located at the Pakistan Tennis Federation Complex, Garden Avenue, Islamabad. Its construction began during the tenure of former Munir Peerzada, who was the PTF Secretary from 1991 to 1995. He acquired 9.5 acres (76 kanals) of land from the Capital Development Authority on a 99-year lease. It was renamed to Dilawar Abbas Pakistan Tennis Complex, after the former two-time PTF President, in 2009.

See also

 Tennis in Pakistan
 Pakistan Davis Cup team
 Pakistan Fed Cup team

External links
 Official website

References 

National members of the Asian Tennis Federation
Players
Tennis
1947 establishments in Pakistan
Sports organizations established in 1947